Islandwood is a townland in the Barony of Ormond Lower, County Tipperary, Ireland. It is located in the civil parish of Modreeny between Borrisokane and Cloughjordan.

References

Townlands of County Tipperary